The following article presents a summary of the 1938 football (soccer) season in Brazil, which was the 37th season of competitive football in the country.

Campeonato Paulista

Final Standings

Corinthians declared as the Campeonato Paulista champions.

State championship champions

(1)In 1938, two different Bahia State Championship competitions were contested. Bahia won one of the competitions while Botafogo-BA won the other.

Other competition champions

Brazil national team
The following table lists all the games played by the Brazil national football team in official competitions and friendly matches during 1938.

References

 Brazilian competitions at RSSSF
 1938 Brazil national team matches at RSSSF

 
Seasons in Brazilian football
Brazil